The Drexel Dragons college football team played until 1973, representing Drexel University.

Seasons

References

Drexel Dragons

Drexel Dragons football seasons